Zhu Benli, or the Dingwu Emperor, is claimed to be the last emperor of the Southern Ming. He inherited the title Prince of Han (韓王). His identity and existence however is of some dispute, and Zhu Youlang is generally taken to be the last emperor of the Southern Ming.

Biography 
His original name was Zhu Danji, and he inherited his father's title of Prince of Han in 1611. During a military campaign against the rebel leader Li Zicheng (李自成) in Pingliang, Gansu in 1643, he was captured, but he was soon released. Li Zicheng then occupied and plundered the capital Beijing, the central government disintegrated, and the reigning Chongzhen Emperor committed suicide.

See also
List of emperors of the Ming dynasty

References

1616 births
1664 deaths
17th-century Chinese monarchs
17th-century executions by China
Executed Ming dynasty people
People executed by strangulation
People executed by the Qing dynasty
People whose existence is disputed
Southern Ming emperors